Chi Delta Mu is a Professional fraternity for students and graduates in the Allied health professions. Founded at Howard University in 1913, Chi Delta Mu was traditionally an African American fraternity.

History 
Chi Delta Mu was founded in the Howard University College of Medicine in 1913. The first meeting laying the ground work for the fraternity took place on January 30, 1913, and it was presided over by E. Clayton Terry and Charles Humbert. The January meeting was attended by twenty-eight students, and several decided to return at a later date to formally establish the details of the new organization. The meeting for organization took place on February 6, 1913, under the guidance of faculty member Dr. William C. McNeill. The name Chi Delta Mu was selected at a special meeting on February 11, 1913. The purpose of the fraternity was to "unite men of the medical professions of Medicine, Dentistry, and Pharmacy into a closer relationship so that the highest degree of efficiency and scientific ability might be developed."

Although traditionally made up of African American students, the fraternity integrated its membership in 1949 when a white student, Howard medical school senior Paul Guth, was admitted to membership in the Alpha chapter.

Hubert Humphrey was initiated as an honorary member of Chi Delta Mu in 1954. He was a key-note speaker at the fraternity's conclave in April of that year, where he was recognized for his efforts in the civil rights movement.

Chapters
 Alpha - Howard University, Washington, DC
 Gamma - St. Louis, Missouri
 Iota - Baltimore, Maryland
 Lambda - Washington, DC
 Nu - Philadelphia, Pennsylvania
 Xi - Brooklyn, New York and Long Island, New York
 Pi - Pittsburgh, Pennsylvania
 Rho - Richmond, Virginia

References

Student organizations established in 1913
Professional fraternities and sororities in the United States
1913 establishments in Washington, D.C.